Britt Raybould is an American CFO and politician from Idaho. Raybould was a member of Idaho House of Representatives from District 34, seat B. Raybould is the first woman president of National Potato Council.

Early life and education 
Raybould was born in Idaho. Raybould is a fourth-generation Idahoan. Raybould's father is Jeff Raybould, a farmer. Raybould's mother is Vickie Raybould. Raybould's grandfather is Dell Raybould, a former politician. Raybould's grandmother is Vera Raybould. In 1997, Raybould graduated from Sugar-Salem High School. In 2001, Raybould earned a Bachelor of Arts degree in English from Boise State University. In 2003, Raybould earned a master's degree in communication from Westminster College in Salt Lake City, Utah.

Career 
In 2016, Raybould became the chief financial officer of Raybould Brothers Farms, a potato farm in Idaho.

In January 2020, Raybould became the president of National Potato Council. Raybould is also the first woman president of National Potato Council. Raybould succeeded Larry Alsum.

Political career 
In 2001, Raybould's political career began when she became an intern for Dirk Kempthorne, governor of Idaho.

Madison County Republican Youth Committeeperson (2015 – 2020)

Idaho Republican Party Region 7 Secretary (2016 – 2018)

Elections

2022 
Raybould ran against incumbent Ron Nate, and won the primary with 50.3% to Nate's 49.7% - a slim 36 vote margin. Raybould is unopposed in the general election.

2020 
Raybould was defeated by past Idaho legislator Ronald M. Nate taking only 47.79% of the vote.

2018 
Raybould defeated Elaine King and Marshall H. Merrell with 44.2% of the vote to replace her retiring grandfather Dell Raybould. Raybould was unopposed in the general election.

Awards 
2020 Spudwoman of the Year. Sponsored by Lockwood Equipment.

Personal life 
Raybould lives in Plano, Idaho. In 2020, Raybould's hometown is St. Anthony, Idaho.

References

External links 
 britt4idaho
 Women in Produce — Britt Raybould at thepacker.com

21st-century American women politicians
Boise State University alumni
Living people
Republican Party members of the Idaho House of Representatives
Westminster College (Utah) alumni
Women state legislators in Idaho
21st-century American politicians
Year of birth missing (living people)